Adderley Park railway station serves the Adderley Park area in the east of Birmingham, England. The station, and all trains serving it, are operated by West Midlands Trains. It was threatened with closure in 2004, but was given a reprieve (although its train service was reduced from half-hourly to hourly each way). The station will become the main railway station for the proposed City of Birmingham Stadium, if that is constructed.

It lies on Bordesley Green Road, part of the B4145.

History

Opened by the London and North Western Railway, it became part of the London, Midland and Scottish Railway 
following the Grouping of 1923. The line passed to the London Midland Region of British Railways on nationalisation in 1948.

When Sectorisation was introduced, the station was served by Regional Railways on behalf of the West Midlands Passenger Transport Executive, for whom British Rail had been running the trains since the PTE's inception. Services on the Intercity Sector would frequently pass through on the West Coast Main Line as these services, run by the current operator, continue to do.

Facilities

The station has a ticket office located at the entrance to platform 1 off Bordesley Green Road which is open Tuesday-Thursday 07:00-12:00, Friday 07:00-10:00, Saturday 12:00-14:00 and Sunday 09:00-14:00. When the ticket office is open tickets must be purchased before boarding the train. Outside of these times there is a ticket machine outside the ticket office which accepts card payments only - cash and voucher payments can be made to the senior conductor on the train.

Cycle parking is available.

There is no step free access to either platforms.

London Midland proposed the closure of the ticket office. The request was denied.

Services
A limited service operates beyond  towards  and  mainly at peak times and the start/end of service.

All services are operated by West Midlands Trains.

Notes

References

 
 
 
 Station on navigable O.S. map

External links

Photographs of Adderley Park station at warwickshirerailways.com
Rail Around Birmingham and the West Midlands: Adderley Park Station

Railway stations in Birmingham, West Midlands
DfT Category E stations
Former London and North Western Railway stations
Railway stations in Great Britain opened in 1860
Railway stations served by West Midlands Trains